The 2015 UniCredit Czech Open was a professional tennis tournament played on clay courts. It was the 22nd edition of the tournament which was part of the 2015 ATP Challenger Tour. It took place in Prostějov, Czech Republic between 1 and 7 June 2015.

Singles main-draw entrants

The tournament enjoyed strong field with several top 100 players. Some players who lost during the first week of French Open were given wild card here.

Seeds

 1 Rankings are as of May 25, 2015.

Other entrants
The following players received wildcards into the singles main draw:
  Santiago Giraldo
  Marcel Granollers
  Martin Kližan
  Jiří Veselý

The following players received entry as alternates into the singles main draw:
  Aldin Šetkić

The following players received entry from the qualifying draw:
  Uladzimir Ignatik
  Henri Laaksonen
  Nikola Mektić
  Axel Michon

Doubles main-draw entrants

Seeds

1 Rankings as of May 25, 2015.

Other entrants
The following pairs received wildcards into the doubles main draw:
  Evgeny Karlovskiy /  Michal Konečný
  Dominik Kellovský /  Jan Šátral
  David Poljak /  Václav Šafránek

Champions

Singles

 Jiří Veselý def.  Laslo Djere, 6–4, 6–2

Doubles

 Julian Knowle /  Philipp Oswald def.  Mateusz Kowalczyk /  Igor Zelenay, 4–6, 6–3, [11–9]

References

External links
 Official website

UniCredit Czech Open
Czech Open (tennis)
2015 in Czech tennis